Närkes Kils SK is a sports club in Närkes Kil, Sweden.

The women's soccer team played in the Swedish top division in 1978.

References

External links
Soccer 
Skiing 

Football clubs in Örebro County
Sport in Örebro County
Ski clubs in Sweden